Sauveterre is a commune in the Gers department in southwestern France.

Geography

Localisation

Hydrology 
The river Gesse forms part of the commune's southern border, then flows into the Save, which forms most of its eastern border.

Population

See also
Communes of the Gers department

References

Communes of Gers